The TR ML class, later known and expanded as the EAR 26 class, was a class of  gauge  steam locomotives designed for and ordered by the Tanganyika Railway (TR), as a development of the TR MK class.

The six members of the ML class were built in 1947 by W. G. Bagnall, in Stafford, England, and delivered to the TR.  They were later operated by the TR's successor, the East African Railways (EAR), as its 26 class.  In 1952, six further members of the 26 class were delivered to the EAR.  They had been built by Vulcan Foundry, of Newton-le-Willows, Lancashire (now part of Merseyside), England, and Robert Stephenson and Hawthorns of North East England.

Class list
The builders number, build year and fleet numbers of each member of the class were as follows:

See also

History of rail transport in Tanzania
Rail transport in Kenya
Rail transport in Uganda

References

Notes

Bibliography

External links

Bagnall locomotives
East African Railways locomotives
Metre gauge steam locomotives
Railway locomotives introduced in 1947
Robert Stephenson and Hawthorns locomotives
Steam locomotives of Tanzania
ML class
Vulcan Foundry locomotives
2-8-2 locomotives
Scrapped locomotives